Stenocercus amydrorhytus is a species of lizard of the Tropiduridae family. It is found in Peru.

References

Stenocercus
Reptiles described in 2015
Endemic fauna of Peru
Reptiles of Peru
Taxa named by Gunther Köhler
Taxa named by Edgar Lehr